First Lady of Afghanistan was the title attributed to the wife of the president of Afghanistan. Rula Ghani, wife of former President Ashraf Ghani, was the last and most recent first lady of Afghanistan from 2014 to 2021.

List of first ladies of Afghanistan
(Scroll Down)

See also
 Queens of Afghanistan
 President of Afghanistan
 List of presidents of Afghanistan
 List of monarchs of Afghanistan

References

External links
 "Afghanistan's next first lady, a Christian Lebanese-American?", Al Arabiya
 "Afghanistan first lady Rula Ghani moves into the limelight", BBC News
 "Will Afghan Leader Ashraf Ghani Bow to Pressure to Hide His Wife?", NBC News
 "Afghanistan's new first lady to focus on women and children", Deutsche Welle
 "The Real First Ladies of Afghanistan", Foreign Policy

First ladies of Afghanistan
Afghan politicians
Afghan